Scandinavia is the eighth studio album by the Danish soft rock band Michael Learns to Rock. It was released on June 11, 2012. It was the first album to be solely produced by the guitarist Mikkel Lentz, who had produced most of the band's previous album, Eternity (2008).

The track "Any Way You Want It" appeared on music charts in Indonesia, India and Denmark. The album received mostly positive reviews from critics with Musicperk giving a rating of 8 out of 10. Timeoutmumbai, a popular Indian site, said, "MLTR's new album is like your old school friend." The album fared well in India and in other South Asian countries.

Track listing

Charts

References

External links
Michael Learns To Rock official website
MLTR on Myspace
http://www.timeoutmumbai.net/music/cd-review/scandinavia

2012 albums
Michael Learns to Rock albums
Sony Music albums
Virgin Records albums
Warner Music Group albums